Colour It In is the debut studio album by the British indie band The Maccabees. It was released in the UK on 14 May and in the US on 22 May 2007. It was released on the UK iTunes Store on 16 April 2007. The album name is from the B-Side from the third single "First Love". The album was named the 24th Best Album of 2007 by NME.

Track listing

 "The Real Thing" - 1:39
 "Just Like the Rain" – 3:51
 "Colour It In" – 1:45
 "Sore Throat" – 2:22
 "Diamond Solitaire" – 0:47
 "Bicycles" – 2:10

Tracks 13 - 18, 2008 Special Edition Bonus Tracks

Certifications

Singles 
"First Love" was the band's first single to crack the UK top 40, peaking at number forty.

"About Your Dress" is the band's fourth single, and their second to make the UK top 40, peaking at number thirty-three - their highest charting single to date.

"Precious Time" is the band's third single released on Fiction Records, and the band's fifth overall. It was their first single under Fiction not to chart in the UK top 40, peaking at Number 49, and preceded the Colour It In album release.

"Toothpaste Kisses", released on 7 January 2008, it is the fourth track released as a single from the album and The Maccabees's sixth single released overall. The song featured in the advertisement for the Samsung SGH-G800 and also featured in the film Angus, Thongs and Perfect Snogging.

References

2007 debut albums
The Maccabees (band) albums
Albums produced by Stephen Street